Lee Edward Weissenborn (March 19, 1929 – May 7, 2017) was an American former politician in the state of Florida.

Biography 

Lee was born in Missouri and came to Florida in 1938. He attended the University of Florida and was an attorney. He also served in the United States Marine Corps. Weissenborn served in the Florida House of Representatives from 1963 to 1966, as a Democrat, representing Dade County. He was elected to the Florida Senate where he served as a distinguished member who was largely responsible for legislation to regulate and protect the migrant farm worker population in then highly agricultural Florida. Weissenborn ran for Congress in 1972 unsuccessfully. Senator Weissenborn is probably best known for his efforts to move the state Capitol from Tallahassee to Central Florida. Although his efforts failed, he is considered chiefly responsible for the construction of a new Florida Capitol building, which has a memorial plaque dedicated to him and acknowledging his role in it. He died in Palmetto Bay, Florida on May 7, 2017, at the age of 88.

References

1929 births
2017 deaths
Democratic Party Florida state senators
Democratic Party members of the Florida House of Representatives
Politicians from St. Louis
Politicians from Miami
Military personnel from St. Louis
University of Florida alumni
Florida lawyers
20th-century American lawyers